Hugo Karl Gottlieb von Kathen (27 August 1855 – 2 April 1932) was a German infantry general during World War I.

Family 
Kathen was born in Freienwalde, Farther Pomerania to the Prussian Major Karl von Kathen (1803–1876), a landowner from Langenhaken in Pomerania, and Agnes née Schumann (1825–1895). His family came originally from Stralsund and became Swedish nobility in 1692.

Kathen married Susanne von Dechend (1859–1929), daughter of Reichsbank president Hermann von Dechend (1814–1890), on 27 September 1884 in Berlin.

Kathen died in Wiesbaden, Hesse.

Commands held 
 2 August - 18 December 1914: military governor of Mainz
 19 December 1914 - 30 July 1918: commanding general of the XXIII Reserve Corps
 31 July - 11 November 1918: commander-in-chief of the 8th army
 until February 1919: commander of the German troops in Lithuania and Estonia
 starting from February 1919: commander of the German troops in Latvia

Medals and decoration 
Pour le Mérite on 28 August 1916; with oak leaves on 27 August 1917

References 

Genealogisches Handbuch des Adels, Adelige Häuser B Band VII, Seite 180, Band 36 der Gesamtreihe, C. A. Starke Verlag, Limburg (Lahn) 1965, .

1855 births
1932 deaths
People from Stargard County
People from the Province of Pomerania
German Army generals of World War I
Recipients of the Pour le Mérite (military class)
Generals of Infantry (Prussia)